Magadan Time (MAGT) (magadanskoye vremya), is a time zone in Russia, named after Magadan, the administrative center of Magadan Oblast. It is 11 hours ahead of UTC (UTC+11) and 8 hours ahead of Moscow Time (MSK+8).

Between 26 October 2014 and 24 April 2016, Magadan Oblast was in UTC+10 (MSK+7), that is Vladivostok Time. During this time, the UTC+11:00 (MSK+8) time zone was named Srednekolymsk Time, and was used by only 27,000 residents in the eastern districts of the Sakha Republic and northern Kuril Islands.

The time in Magadan has been as follows:

Areas on Magadan Time
Magadan Oblast
Sakhalin Oblast

See also
Time in Russia

References

Time zones
Time in Russia
Magadan Oblast